The Core is Bob van Luijt's second studio album with his group Square Orange. It was released on September 4, 2013 on Kubrickology in the Netherlands with a worldwide distribution and features five tracks written by Bob van Luijt.

Critical reception

The Core received generally favorable reviews from critics, with All About Jazz's Bruce Lindsay writing that "Square Orange has a real energy to its performances and the faster numbers are characterised by a full-on wall-of-sound approach."

Track listing
 The Core (Bob van Luijt)
 I Will Think of You (Bob van Luijt)
 Red Moon Suite - Travel (Bob van Luijt)
 Red Moon Suite - Arrival (Bob van Luijt)
 Red Moon Suite - Home (Bob van Luijt)

Personnel 
 Bob van Luijt - bass, compositions, electronics, programming
 Raoul van Herpen — synths
 Florian Weber — piano
 Sjoerd Visser — sax 
 Yonga Sun — drums

External links 
 Bob van Luijt

References

2013 albums
Jazz albums by Dutch artists